Daniel Heath Justice  is an American-born Canadian academic and citizen of the Cherokee Nation. He is professor of First Nations and Indigenous Studies and English at the University of British Columbia. He started his studies at University of Northern Colorado and received his M.A. and Ph.D. from the University of Nebraska–Lincoln. He began his career at the University of Toronto, where he taught English and worked in association with the Aboriginal Studies Program.

Justice is the author of Why Indigenous Literatures Matter (2018) (Wilfrid Laurier University Press), Our Fire Survives the Storm:  A Cherokee Literary History (2006) (University of Minnesota Press), as well as his Indigenous fantasy trilogy, The Way of Thorn & Thunder - Kynship (2005), Wyrwood (2006), and Dreyd (2007) which was published by Kegedonce Press.

Awards 
Why Indigenous Literatures Matter (2018) is the winner of the NAISA (Native American and Indigenous Studies Association) Award for Subsequent Book published in 2018. It also received the 2019 PROSE Award, granted by the Association of American Publishers, in the category of Literature and was nominated for the Gabrielle Roy Prize for Literary Criticism from the Association of Canadian and Quebec Literatures (ACQL). In 2015, Justice was awarded the UBC Killam Research Prize in recognition of his leadership in the field of Indigenous Literary Studies and for his many contributions to it, including Our Fire Survives the Storm: A Cherokee Literary History (2006), The Oxford Handbook of Indigenous American Literature (co-edited with James H. Cox, 2014), and Why Indigenous Literature Matters (2018). In 2010, he was awarded the Ludwik and Estelle Jus Memorial Human Rights Prize at the University of Toronto. James Cox of the University of Texas at Austin stated that "Daniel has devoted his life and work to advocating for the civil and human rights of the silences and dispossessed peoples of our world." The University of Toronto added that Justice's "positive and lasting impact is felt directly at the U of T through his one-on-one work with native students, his ability to bring previously inexperienced young people to thinking about social justice and creative activism against oppression and his encouragement of both graduate and undergraduate students to take on community service as part of classes."

Justice was made an officer of the Order of Canada in 2021.

Books 
 Why Indigenous Literatures Matter (2018)
 Our Fire Survives the Storm: A Cherokee Literary History (2006)
 Reasoning Together: The Native Critics Collective
 Sovereign Erotics: A Collection of Two-Spirit Literature
 The Oxford Handbook of Indigenous American Literature
 Badger (2015)
 W'daub Awae, Speaking True: A Kegedonce Press Anthology
 The Way of Thorn and Thunder: The Kynship Chronicles (2011) (Kynship (2005), Wyrwood (2006) Dreyd (2007))

See also
 List of writers from peoples indigenous to the Americas
 Native American Studies

References

External links
 Daniel Heath Justice website
Daniel Heath Justice articles on The Conversation
Daniel Heath Justice on Twitter

American emigrants to Canada
American fantasy writers
American male non-fiction writers
American male novelists
Canadian fantasy writers
Canadian male non-fiction writers
Cherokee Nation academics
Cherokee writers
Living people
Academic staff of the University of British Columbia
Year of birth missing (living people)
Canadian non-fiction writers
Canadian gay writers
LGBT Native Americans
American LGBT novelists
Canadian LGBT novelists
Native American novelists
21st-century Native Americans
21st-century Canadian LGBT people
Officers of the Order of Canada
American gay writers
Gay novelists